William John Storey (born 13 September 1978) is a British businessman, from Richmond on Thames. He has been involved with the carbonated drink brand Rich Energy since 2015.

He was educated at the Russell School in Petersham and at the Tiffin Boys School in Kingston upon Thames, and later studied maths at the University of St Andrews. He claims to have had short spells in the RAF (or possibly the ATC – accounts differ), as a professional footballer (for QPR reserves), as a professional gambler, and as a tobacco farmer in Zimbabwe. He founded a sports management company, William Storey management, though some of his filings at Companies House describe him as a 'Computer Consultant', and he traded for many years as 'Tryfan Technologies', an IT consultancy.

Storey managed the boxer Frank Buglioni, with whom he founded a fashion company named Danieli Style, and was part of an ill-fated sponsorship deal between the Haas Formula 1 team and Rich Energy. Storey led efforts to return the Rich Energy brand as a Formula 1 team sponsor in 2021, though nothing has materialised.

In 2019, Storey was a defendant in a case brought by Whyte Bikes against Rich Energy for copyright infringement. In finding against Storey and his co-defendants, the judge said that he was not a "credible or reliable witness" and that "He had a tendency to make impressive statements, which on further investigation or consideration were not quite what they seemed."

In July 2020, Storey said he was part of a consortium who were trying to purchase Sunderland Association Football Club, though the Roker Report said the claim did not "stack up", and former club CEO Jim Rodwell declined to comment upon his involvement.

References

Drink company founders
English businesspeople
Sports management companies
1978 births
Living people